Insineratehymn is the fifth studio album by American death metal band Deicide. The band's songwriting on this album exhibits songs with slower and more atmospheric grooves. The track "Bible Basher" is the only song that has become a staple in the band's live set. Rather than being about God, the song "Forever Hate You" is directed at Glen Benton's ex-wife.

Track listing

Personnel
Glen Benton – bass, vocals
Eric Hoffman – guitars
Brian Hoffman – guitars
Steve Asheim – drums

Production
Deicide – production
Jim Morris – recording, engineering, mixing

References

Deicide (band) albums
2000 albums
Roadrunner Records albums